Bon Aqua Junction is a census-designated place and unincorporated community in Hickman County, Tennessee, United States. Its population was 1,230 as of the 2010 census.

Bon Aqua was located at a road junction outside of Bon Aqua, hence the name.

Demographics

References

Census-designated places in Hickman County, Tennessee
Census-designated places in Tennessee